Väinö Alfred Tanner (12 March 1881 – 19 April 1966; surname until 1895 Thomasson) was a leading figure in the Social Democratic Party of Finland, and a pioneer and leader of the cooperative movement in Finland. He was Prime Minister of Finland in 1926–1927.

Tanner was born in Helsinki as the son of a railway brakesman of modest means. After matriculating in 1900, he studied at the business college Suomen Liikemiesten Kauppaopisto (one of two predecessors of the present-day Business College Helsinki). He also studied law, graduating as a jurist in 1911.

Tanner started work as a trainee at the Großeinkaufs-Gesellschaft Deutscher Consumvereine (GEG) in Hamburg, Germany, while still a student, and in 1903, after returning to Finland, became manager of Turun Vähäväkisten Osuusliike, then the largest cooperative retail society in Finland. He was later appointed to the supervisory board of the Helsinki-based cooperative Elanto in 1907, and also became chairman of Suomen Osuuskauppojen Keskuskunta (SOK) in 1909 and CEO of Elanto in 1915. He also served as president of the International Co-operative Alliance (ICA) from 1927 until 1945.

He did not participate in the Finnish Civil War, maintaining a neutral attitude. When the war ended he became Finland's leading Social Democratic Party (SDP) politician, and a strong proponent of the parliamentary system. His main achievement was the rehabilitation of the SDP after the Civil War. Väinö Tanner served as Prime Minister (1926–1927), Minister of Finance (1937–1939), Minister of Foreign Affairs (1939–1940), and after the Winter War Minister of Trade and Industry (1941–1942) and Minister of Finance (1942–1944).

Väinö Tanner's legacy is in his directing the Finnish working class from their extremist ideology towards pragmatic progress through the democratic process. Under his leadership the Social Democrats were trusted to form a minority government already less than 10 years after the bloody civil war. Tanner's minority socialist government passed a series of important social reforms during its time in office, which included a liberal amnesty law, reduced duties on imported foods, and pension and health insurance laws.

During President Relander's brief illness Tanner, who held the post of prime minister, was even the acting president and Commander-In-Chief.  In this role he even received the parade of the White guards on the 10th anniversary of the White victory. This was perceived as a remarkable development at the time. During the 1930s and 1940s, the Social Democrats formed several coalition governments with the Agrarian party. In the Winter War Väinö Tanner was the foreign minister. 
Väinö Tanner's leadership was very important in forming the grounds and creating the Spirit of the Winter War which united the nation.

After the end of the Continuation War, Tanner was tried for responsibility for the war in February 1946, and sentenced to five years and six months in prison.

After the Continuation War, and while still in prison, Tanner became the virtual leader of a faction of the SDP which had strong support from the USA. This faction eventually came out on top after a great deal of internal party strife lasting for much of the 1940s.
Tanner criticised Finland's post-war doctrine known as Paasikivi-Kekkonen doctrine, in which Finnish foreign affairs were kept strictly neutral and friendly with the USSR. Tanner managed to return to the Finnish parliament as a representative in the 1951 parliamentary elections. The acting foreign minister at the time, Åke Gartz insisted that the head of the Finnish Social Democratic Party Emil Skog should try to keep Tanner away from the party. Tanner would go on to win the 1957 SDP chairman election. Tanner won the race by 1 vote. The party was internally divided due to Tanner's controversial past and eventually some representatives seceded and formed a new party called the Social Democratic Union of Workers and Smallholders aka TPSL. TPSL eventually reunited with SDP in December 1972.

Cabinets
 Tanner Cabinet

References 
The Winter War: Finland against Russia 1939–1940 by Väinö Tanner (1957, Stanford University Press, California; also London)

External links

 Väinö Tanner at Britannica Online
 
 

1881 births
1966 deaths
Politicians from Helsinki
People from Uusimaa Province (Grand Duchy of Finland)
Leaders of the Social Democratic Party of Finland
Finnish senators
Prime Ministers of Finland
Ministers of Finance of Finland
Ministers for Foreign Affairs of Finland
Ministers of Trade and Industry of Finland
Members of the Parliament of Finland (1907–08)
Members of the Parliament of Finland (1908–09)
Members of the Parliament of Finland (1909–10)
Members of the Parliament of Finland (1910–11)
Members of the Parliament of Finland (1913–16)
Members of the Parliament of Finland (1919–22)
Members of the Parliament of Finland (1922–24)
Members of the Parliament of Finland (1924–27)
Members of the Parliament of Finland (1930–33)
Members of the Parliament of Finland (1933–36)
Members of the Parliament of Finland (1936–39)
Members of the Parliament of Finland (1939–45)
Members of the Parliament of Finland (1951–54)
Members of the Parliament of Finland (1958–62)
Finnish people of World War II
Cooperative organizers
Prisoners and detainees of Finland
Recipients of Finnish presidential pardons
Cooperative advocates
World War II political leaders